The 8N was a November 8, 2012, political demonstration in Argentina

8N may also refer to:

8N or 8°N, the 8th parallel north latitude
NJ 8N, now New Jersey Route 284
8N, a model of Ford N-Series tractor
8N, a model of Fordson tractor
8N powertrain, used in some Audi TT

See also
N8 (disambiguation)